Inuvik is a city in Canada.

Inuvik can also refer to:

Inuvik Region, an administrative region in Canada
Inuvik (electoral district), a former district representing the city, dissolved in 1999
Inuvik Region, Northwest Territories (former census division), a former census designated statistical area in Canada
Inuvik (Mike Zubko) Airport, in the city of Inuvik
Inuvik/Shell Lake Water Aerodrome, an airport south of the city
CFS Inuvik, a former Canadian Forces signals intercept facility near the city, also known as HMCS Inuvik from 1963 to 1966
Inuvik (crater), a crater on Mars